High is a 2020 Hindi-language crime, thriller drama web series directed by Nikhil Rao and released on MX Player. The series starring Akshay Oberoi, Mrinmayee Godbole and Ranvir Shorey as lead roles.

Plot
Shiv Mathur is a good-hearted drug addict, approaches himself to a rehab center for treatment. The rehab is run by three doctors Shridhar Roy, Nakul and Shweta. The doctors developed something special in rehab, that once it hits the market, people won't be able to keep themselves away from it. The existence of the pill named 'Magic' creates a big disruption in the illegal drug market and manages to grab the attention of a professional assassin, Jackson Lakda and a news reporter Ashima Chauhan. The local gangsters Ghulam Bhai and Munna were involved to run their business of drugs. Eventually Shiv and the doctors make and execute their plan to spread the capsules of the new drug, because the drug is not harmful rather helpful for rehab. Pharmaceutical mafias and drug dealers start hunting them, who is behind the 'Magic'.

Cast
Akshay Oberoi as Shiv Mathur
Ranvir Shorey as Jackson Lakda
Mrinmayee Godbole as Ashima Chauhan
Shweta Basu Prasad as Dr. Shweta
Prakash Belawadi as Dr. Shridhar Roy
Mantra as DJ
Madhur Mittal as Jimmy
Subrat Dutta as Dr. Roy
Kunal Naik as Munna
Nakul Bhalla as Dr. Nakul

References

External links

Indian drama web series
MX Player original programming
Indian crime television series